Boko Assembly constituency is one of the 126 assembly constituencies of Assam Legislative Assembly. Boko forms part of the Gauhati Lok Sabha constituency. It is one of the SC reserved constituencies of Assam. Nandita Das of INC is the present MLA of the constituency.

Town Details

Following are details on Boko Assembly constituency-

Country: India.
 State: Assam.
 District: Kamrup district  .
 Lok Sabha Constituency:  Gauhati Lok Sabha/Parliamentary constituency.
 Assembly Categorisation: Rural.
 Literacy Level:  72.81%.
 Eligible Electors as per 2021 General Elections: 2,36,661   Eligible Electors. Male Electors: 85,984 . Female Electors: 84,350 .
 Geographic Co-Ordinates: 25°57’41.8"N 91°08’25.1"E.
 Total Area Covered:  742 square kilometres.
 Area Includes:Boko thana (excluding Bongaon mouza) in Gauhati sub-division.
 Inter State Border :Kamrup.
 Number of Polling Stations: 238 (2011), 245 (2016), 48 (2021).

Members of Legislative Assembly 

Following is the list of past members representing Boko Assembly constituency in Assam Legislature.

 1951: Radha Charan Choudhury, Socialist Party.
 1957: Radha Charan Choudhury, Indian National Congress.
 1962: Prabin Kumar Choudhury, Indian National Congress.
 1967: Prabin Kumar Choudhury, Indian National Congress.
 1972: Prabin Kumar Choudhury, Indian National Congress.
 1978: Umesh Chandra Das, Janata Party.
 1983: Upendra Das, Indian National Congress.
 1985: Gopinath Das, Independent.
 1991: Gopinath Das, Indian National Congress.
 1996: Jyoti Prasad Das, Asom Gana Parishad.
 2001: Gopinath Das, Indian National Congress.
 2006: Jyoti Prasad Das, Asom Gana Parishad.
 2011: Gopinath Das, All India United Democratic Front.
 2016: Nandita Das, Indian National Congress.
 2021: Nandita Das, Indian National Congress.

Election results

2021 result

2016 result

2011 result

External links

References 

Assembly constituencies of Assam